Filodes bilinealis is a moth of the family Crambidae described by George Hampson in 1908. It is found in Sri Lanka.

This species has a wingspan of 38 mm.

References

Moths described in 1908
Spilomelinae
Moths of Sri Lanka